Daniela Calvetti is an Italian-American applied mathematician whose work concerns scientific computing, and connects Bayesian statistics to numerical analysis. She is the James Wood Williamson Professor of Mathematics at Case Western Reserve University.

Education and career
Calvetti earned a laurea in mathematics at the University of Bologna in 1980. She went to the University of North Carolina at Chapel Hill for graduate study in mathematics, earning a master's degree there in 1985 and completing her Ph.D. in 1989. Her dissertation, A Stochastic Round Off Error Analysis for the Fast Fourier Transform, was supervised by John Tolle.

After taking faculty positions at North Carolina State University, Colorado State University–Pueblo, and the Stevens Institute of Technology, she moved to Case Western Reserve University in 1997. She was given the James Wood Williamson Professorship in 2013.

Books
With Erkki Somersalo, Calvetti is the co-author of three books, Introduction to Bayesian Scientific Computing: Ten Lectures on Subjective Computing (Springer, 2007), Computational Mathematical Modeling: An Integrated Approach Across Scales (SIAM, 2013)  and Mathematics of Data Science: A Computational Approach to Clustering and Classification (SIAM, 2020).

References

External links
Home page

21st-century American mathematicians
American women mathematicians
20th-century Italian mathematicians
Italian women mathematicians
University of Bologna alumni
University of North Carolina at Chapel Hill alumni
North Carolina State University faculty
Colorado State University Pueblo faculty
Stevens Institute of Technology faculty
Case Western Reserve University faculty
21st-century Italian mathematicians
20th-century American mathematicians
Year of birth missing (living people)
Living people
20th-century American women
21st-century American women
20th-century Italian women
21st-century Italian women